Duchesse Anne (formerly called Großherzogin Elisabeth) is the last remaining full-rigged ship under French flag. She was built in 1901 with a steel hull by the yard of Joh. C. Tecklenborg of Bremerhaven-Geestemünde (Germany) according to plans drawn by Georg W. Claussen. The mainmast is 48 m tall and 25 sails were rigged. She was used as a training ship for young aspiring sailors in the German merchant marine.

History

The ship was handed over to France as war reparations after World War II and renamed Duchesse Anne. The ship has been classified a historical monument since 5 November 1982.

Similar ships
Several other training windjammers of the German "Deutscher Schulschiff-Verein" also survive to this day:
Dar Pomorza (originally Prinzess Eitel Friedrich)
Schulschiff Deutschland 
Statsraad Lehmkuhl (originally Großherzog Friedrich August)

References

External links

Individual sailing vessels
Tall ships of France
Full-rigged ships
1901 ships
Ships built in Bremen (state)
Museum ships in France